The 1950 United States Senate election in North Carolina was held on November 7, 1950. Incumbent Democratic Senator Clyde R. Hoey was re-elected to a second term in office over Republican Halsey B. Leavitt.

General election

Candidates
Clyde R. Hoey, incumbent Senator since 1945 (Democratic)
Halsey B. Leavitt, insurance executive (Republican)

Results

Footnotes

1950
North C
1950 North Carolina elections